Dainon Tarquinius Sidney (born May 30, 1975 in Atlanta, Georgia) is a former American football cornerback in the National Football League. He played for the Tennessee Titans from 1998 to 2002 and helped them make Super Bowl XXXIV in which Sidney appeared as a substitute, however they lost to the Kurt Warner-led St. Louis Rams. He also played for the Buffalo Bills and the Detroit Lions. He was hired as the temporary Defensive Back coach for the Austin Peay State University football team in 2008 Under Head Coach Rick Christophel. He currently is a member of staff at McGavock High School.

References

1975 births
Living people
Players of American football from Atlanta
American football cornerbacks
East Tennessee State Buccaneers football players
UAB Blazers football players
Tennessee Titans players
Buffalo Bills players
Detroit Lions players